Stillingia argutedentata is a species of flowering plant in the family Euphorbiaceae. It was described by Eugene Jablonszky in 1967. It is native to Minas Gerais, Brazil.

References

argutedentata
Plants described in 1967
Flora of Brazil